Károly Sterk (19 September 1881 – 10 December 1946) was a Hungarian chess master.

He tied for 2nd-4th at Budapest 1909 (Zsigmond Barász won), played at Vienna 1909/10 (the 2nd Trebitsch Memorial, Richard Réti won), tied for 3rd-5th at Budapest 1911 (the 3rd Hungarian Championship, Zoltán von Balla and Barász won), tied for 9-11th at Bad Pistyan 1912 (Akiba Rubinstein won), took 10th at Temesvár 1912 (HUN-ch, Gyula Breyer won), took 12th at Budapest 1913 (Rudolf Spielmann won), shared 2nd with Réti, behind Lajos Asztalos, at Debrecen 1913 (HUN-ch), and tied for 2nd-3rd with Barász, behind Breyer, at Budapest 1917. He lost two matches to Géza Maróczy in 1907 and 1917, both (+1 –2 =3).

After World War I, he mainly played in Budapest where took 10th in 1921 (Alexander Alekhine won), tied for 8-9th in 1922, took 3rd and 4th in 1924, shared 1st and took 5th in 1925,  tied for 4-5th, took 6th, and won in 1926, tied for 7-8th and took 10th in 1928, tied for 6-7th in 1929, won and shared 1st in 1930, took 2nd in 1931 (HUN-ch, Lajos Steiner won), tied for 12-13th in 1932 (HUN-ch, Maróczy won), and tied for 9-10th in 1934 (Erich Eliskases won).
  
He also took 9th at Bardejov 1926 (Hermanis Matisons and Savielly Tartakower won), tied for 3rd-4th at London 1927, took 15th at Ujpest 1934 (Andor Lilienthal won), and tied for 11-16th at Tatatóváros 1935 (HUN-ch, László Szabó won).

Sterk played for Hungary in unofficial and official Chess Olympiads at Paris 1924, Budapest 1926, and Prague 1931.

References

External links
 Chessgames of Károly Sterk

1881 births
1946 deaths
Hungarian chess players
Chess Olympiad competitors